Heart Yorkshire (previously Real Radio Yorkshire) is a regional radio station owned by Communicorp UK and operated by Global as part of the Heart network. It broadcasts to South and West Yorkshire from studios in Leeds.

Overview

Real Radio
Real Radio Yorkshire launched on 25 March 2002.  The station transmitted from Emley Moor on 106.2 MHz FM, which covers the majority of South Yorkshire and West Yorkshire, including Doncaster, Huddersfield, Leeds, Rotherham and Wakefield. It also broadcast from Idle on 107.6 MHz FM to Bradford and Halifax, and on 107.7 MHz FM from Tapton Hill to Sheffield. Real Radio Yorkshire also broadcast across the whole of Yorkshire on DAB using the Regional MXR multiplex.

Heart
On 25 June 2012 it was announced Global (the owner of stations such as Capital and Heart) had bought GMG Radio. The former GMG stations, including Real Radio, continued to operate separately as 'Real and Smooth Limited' until 1 April 2014.

On 6 February 2014, Global announced it would be rebranding all Real Radio stations as Heart. On 1 May 2014, local programming moved from Tingley, Wakefield to share facilities with sister station Capital Yorkshire in Hanover Walk, Leeds.

The full relaunch as Heart Yorkshire took place on Tuesday 6 May 2014. The station's audience share increased from 5.5% to over 7% following the relaunch. In June 2015 the Yorkshire MXR multiplex closed. Heart Yorkshire moved their services to local multiplexes in Leeds, Bradford and Sheffield, however they chose not to take up options in Hull and York.

In February 2019, following OFCOM's decision to relax local content obligations from commercial radio, Global announced it would replace Heart Yorkshire's local breakfast and weekend shows with networked programming from London.

As of 3 June 2019, the station's local output consists of a three-hour Drivetime show on weekdays, alongside local news bulletins, traffic updates and advertising.

Programming
All networked programming originates from Global's London headquarters, including Heart Breakfast, presented each weekday by Jamie Theakston and Amanda Holden.

Regional programming is produced and broadcast from Global's Leeds studios from 4-7pm on weekdays, presented by David Dixon and Emma Lenney.

News
Global's Leeds newsroom broadcasts hourly regional news bulletins from 6am-7pm on weekdays and 6am-12pm at weekends with headlines on the half hour during weekday breakfast and drivetime shows.

National news updates air hourly from Global's London headquarters at all other times. The Leeds newsroom also produces bulletins for Capital Yorkshire.

Former notable presenters

Wes Butters 
Rich Clarke 
Gary Davies
Daryl Denham
Martin Kelner 

Debbie Lindley 
Ryan Seacrest 
Graeme Smith 
Chris Tarrant
Kate Thornton

References

External links
Heart Yorkshire

Communicorp
Yorkshire
Mass media in Leeds
Radio stations established in 2002
Radio stations in Yorkshire
2002 establishments in England